The 30 megawatt Cullerin Range Wind Farm is  located in the localities of Cullerin and Breadalbane in the Upper Lachlan Shire, New South Wales, Australia. The wind farm was completed in 2009 and cost around $90 million. The owner, Origin Energy, sold the business to Energy Developments, a subsidiary of Duet.

Incidents
On 5 January 2023, at about 6am, an electrical fire broke out in the generator cabin of one turbine. Local NSW Rural Fire Service firefighters attended the scene, to ensure that burning debris did not cause a fire on the ground. The three blades had been stopped with one vertical and that was consumed by the fire.

See also

Gunning Wind Farm
Wind power in Australia
List of wind farms in New South Wales

References

External links
 

Wind farms in New South Wales